The Big Sell-Out is the fourth studio album by the experimental college rock/art-rock band Bongwater. It was recorded in 1991 and released in 1992. In 1998, the album was remastered by Alan Douches and Kramer for its inclusion in Box of Bongwater set.

The album is widely considered to be a representation of the growing rift between Magnuson and Kramer. The cover boasts of containing the singles "Celebrity Compass", "Schmoozedance", and "Free Love Messes Up My Life". "Celebrity Compass" was originally introduced during a performance of "You Don't Love Me Yet" by Roky Erikson on an episode of the variety show Night Music, which also featured Screamin' Jay Hawkins.

Maintaining their tradition of neo-psychedelia, "Ye Olde Backlash" contains a melody somewhat reminiscent of "For Your Love" by The Yardbirds. The band's habit of name-dropping also continues as Magnuson mentions a casual meeting with Lenny Kravitz in the song "What's Big in England Now?"

The title track ends with a sound file of the self-promotional audio tape by "J&H Productions", the talent agency of an unknown man living in Cincinnati, Ohio sent to the entertainment industry, claiming to represent "star after star after star". "Holding Hands" is actually a gruesome tale of young lovers trying to escape Nazi-occupation of some undetermined Eastern European country. The album ends with a cover of the Fred Neil song "Everybody's Talkin'" where Ann narrates, assisting one of her relatives in suicide prevention.

Track listing

Personnel 
Adapted from the liner notes of The Power of Pussy.

Bongwater
Randolph A. Hudson III – guitar
Kramer – vocals, instruments, engineering, production
David Licht – drums, percussion
Ann Magnuson – vocals

Production and additional personnel
Laurie Henzel – art direction
Michael Lavine – photography
Ron Paul – assistant engineer

Release history

References

External links 
 

1992 albums
Albums produced by Kramer (musician)
Bongwater (band) albums
Shimmy Disc albums